The surname Mullins is of Irish origin, and is akin to Mullen and McMillan.

Geographical distribution
At the time of the United Kingdom Census of 1901 (the data for Ireland) and the United Kingdom Census of 1881 (the data for the rest of the United Kingdom), the frequency of the surname Mullins was highest in the following counties:

 County Clare (1:508)
 County Limerick (1:697)
 County Galway (1:950)
 County Cork (1:1,042)
 County Waterford (1:1,133)
 County Kilkenny (1:1,217)
 Wiltshire (1:1,390)
 Dorset (1:1,442)
 County Tipperary (1:1,525)
 King's County (1:1,547)

As of 2014, the frequency of the surname was highest in the following countries and territories:

 Republic of Ireland (1:1,502)
 United States (1:4,189)
 Wales (1:4,821)
 Australia (1:5,475)
 Jersey (1:5,824)
 Barbados (1:7,308)
 England (1:8,431)
 New Zealand (1:9,414)
 Scotland (1:12,619)
 Canada (1:14,092)

As of 2014, 76.7% of all known bearers of the surname Mullins were residents of the United States. The frequency of the surname was higher than national average in the following U.S. states:

 West Virginia (1:496)
 Kentucky (1:577)
 Virginia (1:1,104)
 Tennessee (1:1,240)
 Ohio (1:1,973)
 Alabama (1:2,305)
 Mississippi (1:2,361)
 Indiana (1:2,503)
 Arkansas (1:2,538)
 Oklahoma (1:2,618)
 Michigan (1:4,066)
 Missouri (1:4,077)
 Delaware (1:4,122)

The frequency of the surname was highest in the following U.S. counties (over 20 times the national average):

 Dickenson County, Va. (1:14)
 Wise County, Va. (1:28)
 Knott County, Ky. (1:40)
 Letcher County, Ky. (1:46)
 McDowell County, W.Va. (1:52)
 Buchanan County, Va. (1:71)
 Hancock County, Tenn. (1:75)
 Breathitt County, Ky. (1:76)
 Pike County, Ky. (1:76)
 Menifee County, Ky. (1:90)
 Clay County, W.Va. (1:97)
 Pickett County, Tenn. (1:104)
 Logan County, W.Va. (1:106)
 Rockcastle County, Ky. (1:111)
 Lincoln County, W.Va. (1:112)
 Floyd County, Ky. (1:115)
 Owsley County, Ky. (1:116)
 Perry County, Ky. (1:118)
 Franklin County, Miss. (1:118)
 Lee County, Va. (1:119)
 Russell County, Va. (1:127)
 Washington County, Va. (1:148)
 Magoffin County, Ky. (1:162)
 Scott County, Va. (1:173)
 Wyoming County, W.Va. (1:174)
 Tazewell County, Va. (1:175)
 Boone County, W.Va. (1:186)
 Mingo County, W.Va. (1:192)
 Nicholas County, W.Va. (1:195)
 Powell County, Ky. (1:205)

With the single exception of Franklin County, Mississippi, these are all Appalachian counties.

People with the surname Mullins
 Aimee Mullins (b. 1976), American athlete and performer
 Andria Mullins (b. 1980), American beauty queen and performer
 Bill Mullins, Australian rugby player
 Bitsy Mullins (b. 1926–2003), American trumpeter
 Brett Mullins (b. 1972), Australian rugby player
 Brian Mullins (b. 1954), Irish Gaelic football player
 Brian Mullins (hurler) (b. 1978), Irish hurler
 Cedric Mullins (b. 1994), American baseball player
 Charles Herbert Mullins (b. 1869–1916), a South African Victoria Cross recipient
 Charlie Mullins (b. 1952), British businessman, founder of Pimlico Plumbers
 Chucky Mullins (1969–1991), American football player
 Clarence H. Mullins (1895–1957), American federal judge
 Craig Mullins (b. 1964), American conceptual artist
 Daniel Mullins (1929-2019), British Roman Catholic bishop
 Dan Mullins (b. 1976), South African sports photographer 
 Dan Mullins (b. 1978), English drummer
 David Mullins (disambiguation)
 Edgar Young Mullins (1860–1928), American Baptist minister
 Edwin Mullins (b. 1933), British art critic and television presenter
 Edwin Roscoe Mullins (1848-1907), English sculptor
 Eustace Mullins (1923–2010), American political writer
 Fran Mullins, American baseball player
 Frederick Mullins (d. 1854), Irish politician
 Freddy Mullins (b.1979), American Musician and Actor
 George Mullins (1763–1765), Irish painter
 Gerry Mullins (b. 1949), American football player
 Gustav Mullins (photographer) (1854–1921), royal photographer
 Hayden Mullins (b. 1979), English soccer player
 Henry Mullins (1861–1952), Canadian businessman and politician
 James Mullins (American politician) (1807–1873), an American politician
 James P. Mullins (b. 1928), American general]]
 James Patrick Mullins (1874–1965), Canadian politician, member of Parliament
 Jeff Mullins (basketball) (b. 1942), American basketball player
 Jeff Mullins (politician), American politician
 Jimmy "Mercy Baby" Mullins (1930–1977), American blues musician
 John Mullins (disambiguation)
 Larry Mullins (1908–1968), American football coach
 Leonard Mullins (1918–1997), English rubber scientist, the Mullins effect
 Lisa Mullins, American radio news anchor
 Mark Mullins (economist) (b. 1961), Canadian economist
 Matt Mullins (b. 1980), American martial artist
 Mavis Mullins, New Zealand businesswoman
 Megan Mullins (b. 1987), American musician
 Melinda Mullins (b. 1958), American actress
 Mike Mullins (rugby union) (b. 1970), Irish rugby player
 Nathan Mullins (born 1989/90), Irish Gaelic football player and son of Brian
 Nick Mullins, English rugby player
 Pat Mullins (1938–2017), American politician
 Priscilla Alden (c. 1602 – c. 1680), née Mullins, American Pilgrim
 Rich Mullins (1955–1997), American musician
 Shawn Mullins (b. 1968), American musician
 Skipper Mullins (born c. 1945), American martial artist
 Sue Mullins, American politician
 Thomas Mullins (Irish politician) (1904–1978), Irish politician
 Thomas Mullins (British Army officer) (d. 1823), English soldier
 William Mullins, several people

See also
 Mullen (disambiguation)
 Mullens (disambiguation)
 Mullin

References